This is a list of public art in the City of London, including statues, busts, commemorative plaques and other memorials.

The City of London is the historic nucleus of London as well as its modern financial centre. The City of London Corporation, its municipal governing body, states that "around almost every corner in the City you will find an unusual piece of public art or a commemoration of the City's great history". This article lists the various permanent works of public art by the ward in which they are located.

In the 19th century, sculpture was incorporated into major engineering schemes such as the Victoria Embankment and the Holborn Viaduct. Entrances to the City are marked by statues of dragons (often mistakenly called griffins) bearing the City's shield. The most elaborate of these is the Temple Bar Marker of 1880, which replaced a gate to the City, while two on the Victoria Embankment were originally made for the Coal Exchange building in 1849, and were repurposed as boundary markers in 1963.

Since 2010, the City has hosted an annual exhibition of public sculpture, called "Sculpture in the City".

Aldersgate

Aldgate

Bassishaw

Billingsgate

Bishopsgate

Broadgate

Liverpool Street station

Bread Street

Bridge and Bridge Without

Broad Street

Candlewick

Castle Baynard

Eastern end of Fleet Street to Ludgate Circus

St Paul's Cathedral

St Paul's Churchyard
See also Emily Young's Angel series above, in the ward of Bread Street

Cheap

Coleman Street

Cordwainer

Cornhill

Cripplegate

Dowgate

Farringdon Within

Old Bailey

St Bartholomew-the-Great

Farringdon Without

Chancery Lane

Fetter Lane

Holborn

Smithfield

Temple and western end of Fleet Street

Victoria Embankment

Langbourn

Lime Street

Portsoken

Queenhithe

Tower

Vintry

Walbrook

Bank of England

See also
 Charles II trampling Cromwell, formerly at the Stocks Market
 Statue of John Cass, formerly on Aldgate High Street and then Jewry Street

References

Bibliography

External links
 
 Sculpture in the City

Buildings and structures in the City of London
Public art
Public art in London
Tourist attractions in the City of London
Lists of public art in England